Lenkei is a Hungarian surname. Notable people with the surname include:

 Ferenc Lenkei (born 1946), Hungarian swimmer
 Magda Lenkei (1916–2007), Hungarian swimmer
 Sándor Lenkei (1936–2003), Hungarian footballer

Hungarian-language surnames